Bernard Kouakou Kouassi (born 1 January 1980) is an Ivorian former professional footballer who played as a goalkeeper. He played in one match for the Ivory Coast national team in 2001. He was also named in Ivory Coast's squad for the 2002 African Cup of Nations tournament.

References

External links
 

1980 births
Living people
Ivorian footballers
Association football goalkeepers
Ivory Coast international footballers
2002 African Cup of Nations players